Andrea Chiurato (born 7 February 1965 in Montebelluna) is an Italian former road bicycle racer.

Major results

1990
1st, Stage 1, Giro di Calabria
1993
1st, Stage 11, Vuelta a Méjico
1994
1st, Gran Premio di Lugano
2nd, World Time Trial Championships
1995
1st, Karlsruheversicherungs GP (with Tony Rominger)
1st, Grand Prix de Wallonie
1st, Stages 2 and 3, Vuelta a Asturias

External links
Palmarès by cyclingbase.com 

1965 births
Living people
People from Montebelluna
Italian male cyclists
Cyclists from the Province of Treviso